Sunchon station is a railway station in Sunch'ŏn municipal city, South P'yŏngan province, North Korea on the P'yŏngra Line of the Korean State Railway; it is also the starting point of the Manp'o Line.

History

The station was opened on 15 October 1928 by the Chosen Government Railway, along with the rest of the second section of the former P'yŏngwŏn Line from P'yŏngsŏng to Sunch'ŏn; this later became part of the P'yŏngra Line.

References

Railway stations in North Korea